Gábor Gréczi (born 3 May 1993) is a Hungarian professional footballer who plays for Tiszakécske.

Club statistics

Updated to games played as of 6 December 2014.

References
MLSZ 
HLSZ 

1993 births
Sportspeople from Szeged
Living people
Hungarian footballers
Association football forwards
Kecskeméti TE players
BFC Siófok players
Nyíregyháza Spartacus FC players
Tiszakécske FC footballers
Nemzeti Bajnokság I players
Nemzeti Bajnokság II players
Nemzeti Bajnokság III players